Yenan may refer to:
 Wade–Giles romanization (Yen-an) of the city name Yan'an in China
 SS Yenan, a Burmese coastal tanker
 The Yenan faction, a group of pro-China communists in the North Korean government after the division of Korea